The 1784 English cricket season was the 13th in which matches have been awarded retrospective first-class cricket status. The scorecard of only one first-class match has survived.

Matches 
A single first-class match scorecard survives from 1784. The match was played between an England side and a Hampshire XI at Sevenoaks Vine in June.

First mentions
 J. Cole (Hampshire)
 Davidson (Essex)
 Jack Small

References

Further reading
 
 
 
 
 

1784 in English cricket
English cricket seasons in the 18th century